Martin Kirschner (28 October 1879 – 30 August 1942) was a German surgeon.

Kirschner was born  in Breslau, the son of Margarethe Kalbeck (sister of Max Kalbeck) and Judge Martin Kirschner (1842–1912), who later served as city councillor (member of the city government) of Breslau since 1873 and a member of the city parliament as of 1879. In 1892, he became burgomaster of Berlin (vice-mayor) and advanced to its Lord Mayor (Oberbürgermeister) holding that office between 1899 and 1912.

Kirschner junior attended the universities of Freiburg, Strassburg, Zurich and Munich.

Following his promotion in Strassburg in 1904 he went to Berlin for postgraduate studies under Rudolf von Renvers (1854–1909). Between 1908 and 1910 he was at the university surgical clinic in Greifswald under Erwin Payr (1871–1947), then went to Königsberg to work with Payr and Paul Leopold Friedrich (1864–1916). He was appointed professor of surgery at Königsberg in 1916, and in 1927 accepted an invitation to move to the same chair in Tübingen.
 
On 18 March 1924, Kirschner performed the first successful pulmonary artery embolectomy — Trendelenburg's operation. He developed a new method for the making an artificial oesophagus and a method for the opening of the knee joint.

In 1933, he published the first stereotactic surgery in humans, for a method to treat trigeminal neuralgia by inserting an electrode into the trigeminal nerve and ablating it.

Kirschner died, aged 62, in Heidelberg.

See also
Kirschner wire

References

External links
 Ole Daniel Enersen: Martin Kirschner, in:  Who named it? Biographical dictionary of medical eponyms

1879 births
1942 deaths
German surgeons
Physicians from Wrocław
People from the Province of Silesia
University of Freiburg alumni
University of Strasbourg alumni
Ludwig Maximilian University of Munich alumni
Academic staff of the University of Greifswald
Academic staff of the University of Königsberg
Academic staff of the University of Tübingen